Sphaerophoria scripta, the long hoverfly, is a species of hoverfly belonging to the family Syrphidae.

Distribution
This species has a worldwide distribution. It can be found in most of Europe, in the eastern Palearctic realm, in the Near East, in the Nearctic realm, in North Africa and in the Indomalayan realm.

Habitat
This species lives in thickets, gardens and meadows rich of flowering plants. Adults can pollinate flowering plants such as Galeopsis angustifolia andSilene gallica, which S. scripta are the most effective pollinators of.

Description

Body is long and narrow, with yellow and black bands. The wings are transparent. Antennae are short and yellow. The face is yellow. Thorax is a bit dull, copper colored with broad yellow side stripes. Scutellum is yellow. Abdomen is long and cylindrical with four wide, yellow transverse bands. The legs are yellow. Females are brighter than the males. In the males the last two bands are often blurred.

Biology
The adult hoverflies can be found from April to November. The larvae feed on aphids, while adult hoverflies feed on nectar and pollen of various species of Asteraceae, as well as on Heracleum sphondylium, Galeopsis tetrahit, Malva moschata and Parnassia palustris.

These hoverflies can complete a full life cycle in as little as sixteen days (egg to egg-laying adult), and a maximum of nine generations may occur in a single year. This species is migratory and overwinter as larva.

Gallery

References

Brachyceran flies of Europe
Syrphini
Flies described in 1758
Articles containing video clips
Taxa named by Carl Linnaeus